Hannah Minthorne Tompkins (August 28, 1781 – February 18, 1829) was the wife of Daniel D. Tompkins, the governor of New York and later vice president of the United States, and thus was the first lady of New York 1807 to 1817 and then the second lady of the United States from 1817 to 1825.

Born on August 28, 1781, Hannah Minthorne was the second child of Mangle Minthorne (1740–1824), a prominent Democratic-Republican Party member in New York City, by his second wife, Aryet Constable Minthorne (1743–1830), of New York City. On February 20, 1798, 16-year-old Hannah married Daniel D. Tompkins, a 23-year-old lawyer of the City.  At the time of the marriage, her father was Assistant in the Common Council, and young Tompkins had designs on a political career. Hannah was ill the year before her husband became vice president, and she did not attend his inauguration.

From 1800 to 1814, the couple had eight children, including Arietta Minthorn Tompkins (born July 31, 1800), who married a son of Smith Thompson in 1818, and (Mangle) Minthorne Tompkins (December 26, 1807 – June 5, 1881), who was the Free Soil Party candidate for governor of New York in 1852. Their children Hannah and Minthorne were named after their mother, and Hannah and Minthorne streets in Staten Island were named for them.

Hannah died on February 18, 1829 in Tompkinsville, Staten Island. She and her husband are buried in the Minthorne family vault at St. Mark's-in-the-Bouwerie in lower Manhattan.

References

External links
 Minthorne family history 

|-

1781 births
1829 deaths
First ladies and gentlemen of New York (state)
People from Tompkinsville, Staten Island
Second ladies of the United States
Burials in New York (state)